Canteen Stores Department (CSD) is a Pakistani chain of retail stores headquartered in Rawalpindi, Pakistan.

It is run by the Pakistani Ministry of Defence and currently manages 108 stores, making it the second largest retail chain in the country after Utility Stores Corporation.

References

External links
 

Supermarkets of Pakistan
Pakistani brands
Retail companies established in 1913
1913 establishments in India
Pakistan Army affiliated organizations
Companies based in Rawalpindi